Andrea Schiavone (born 25 February 1993) is an Italian professional footballer who plays as a midfielder for  club Südtirol.

Club career

Juventus
Born in Turin, Schiavone began his playing career within the youth ranks of local giants, Juventus in  Working his way through the club's renowned youth academy, Schiavone was promoted to the Primavera (under-20) squad in 2010, and going on to captain the team before graduating the academy at the conclusion of the 2012–13 season. Schiavone was one of the four overage player for the Primavera that season, as the age limit had changed to under-19. Half of the registration rights of Schiavone was also sold to Siena for €1.5 million, as a cashless swap with Marcel Büchel.  Schiavone was instead sent to recently relegated Serie B side, A.C. Siena in order to experience regular first-team football.

Siena
On 1 July 2013, Schiavone formally became a player of Siena. Schiavone went on to become an important part of the Tuscan outfit who would have finished third in the 2013–14 Serie B and, in turn, earn a promotion play-off spot were it not for an eight-point deduction thanks to financial irregularities. He finished his first season of professional football having made 21 league appearances for the Robur, scoring two goals.

On 18 June 2014, Juventus and Siena had reached an agreement for the co-ownership of the player to be renewed for another year, with Siena keeping hold of the player's registration rights ahead of the 2014–15 Serie B season. The new agreement would expire on 19 June 2015.

Return to Juventus
On 15 July 2014, Juventus officially re-signed their former youth team captain after Siena officially bankrupted following their failure to register for the upcoming Serie B campaign, and thus being entered into Serie D for the 2014–15 Serie D season. All of their players were therefore released from their contracts and free to sign on with other clubs. Schiavone was re-signed by Juventus instead.

Cesena
On 1 July 2016, he was signed by Serie B club Cesena.

The club folded in 2018.

Venezia
In July 2018 Schiavone joined Venezia on a three-year contract.

Bari
On 24 July 2019, he signed a three-year contract with Bari.

Salernitana
On 23 September 2020, he joined Salernitana on loan with an obligation to buy.

Südtirol
On 2 September 2022, Schiavone joined Südtirol until the end of the 2022–23 season.

International career
Schiavone has represented Italy at various youth levels. He has appeared in 24 matches for the Azzurini and has scored one goal. Eleven of his 24 international matches came for the Italy under-20 national team.

References

1993 births
Living people
Footballers from Turin
Association football midfielders
Italian footballers
Italy youth international footballers
Italy under-21 international footballers
Juventus F.C. players
A.C.N. Siena 1904 players
Modena F.C. players
U.S. Livorno 1915 players
A.C. Cesena players
Venezia F.C. players
S.S.C. Bari players
U.S. Salernitana 1919 players
F.C. Südtirol players
Serie A players
Serie B players
Serie C players